The Christopher C. Walker House and Farm is a historic farmstead in the far western part of the U.S. state of Ohio.

Christopher Walker
During the late nineteenth century, Christopher Walker was one of Darke County's leading farmers.  Born in Baltimore County, Maryland in 1829, he moved to Darke County with his parents, who first settled in Butler Township.  Beginning in 1851 and continuing through most of the rest of the decade, he participated in owning and running a local store in Braffettsville, which position he occupied through most of the rest of the decade; during this time, he married the former Mary Brawley.  By 1858, Walker had become dissatisfied with storekeeping; he sold his interest in the store and began farming, purchasing the farm in Harrison Township near New Madison in 1862.

From his earliest years as an independent farmer, Walker was primarily a raiser of livestock: from 1862 to 1866, he was engaged with his brothers in distributing hogs, and after that business venture failed, he began to concentrate on producing his own livestock.

Recognition
Two of the farm's buildings have been widely recognized: the 1879 barn and the 1884 house. Likewise, the farmhouse was built for the convenience of its residents: mixing the Victorian, Second Empire, and Italianate styles of architecture, it is dominated by a tower with a Mansard roof, and it sits atop a small hill overlooking State Route 121 to the north.

The Walker farm remains a local landmark to the present day, evoking a strong contrast between its ornate nineteenth-century architecture and the plain modern architecture of the farms around it.  In 1982, the farm complex was placed on the National Register of Historic Places, both because of its well-preserved historic architecture and because of its contribution to local history.  Key to its importance in local history is Walker's contribution to Darke County agriculture, as the farm buildings were a leading element of his livestock programs that made the county one of Ohio's foremost in hog raising.

References

https://mapleviewestate.wixsite.com/mysite

Houses completed in 1879
Houses completed in 1884
Houses in Darke County, Ohio
Farms on the National Register of Historic Places in Ohio
Houses on the National Register of Historic Places in Ohio
Italianate architecture in Ohio
National Register of Historic Places in Darke County, Ohio
Second Empire architecture in Ohio